Palazzia pankakare is a species of sea snail, a marine gastropod mollusk, unassigned in the superfamily Seguenzioidea.

Description

Distribution

References

pankakare
Gastropods described in 2009